General elections were held in Botswana on 20 October 1979. The result was a fourth successive landslide victory for the Botswana Democratic Party (BDP), which won 29 of the 32 elected seats, including two in which they were unopposed.

Campaign
A total of 69 candidates contested the election. The BDP was the only party to run a full slate of 32 candidates, with the Botswana National Front putting forward 16 candidates, the  Botswana People's Party 14 and the Botswana Independence Party five. There were also two independents. The BDP campaigned on opposition to apartheid in South Africa and a call for economic sanctions against Zimbabwe-Rhodesia.

Prior to the elections, the voter roll was completely revamped. The revision was accompanied by a vigorous radio and press campaign by the government to encourage registration. Although the number of registered voters increased by only 6,635 compared to the 1974 elections, this was deemed to be due to the 1974 voter roll having numerous duplications.

Results

References

Elections in Botswana
General
Bostwana
Election and referendum articles with incomplete results
Botswana